Greece: Secrets of the Past is a 2006 IMAX film documenting the Golden Age of Greece. The film has a 45-minute runtime. The movie was produced by the same team behind Everest- MacGillivray Freeman Films. Set throughout the Greek Isles, the film depicts both contemporary archeological digs and historical depictions/reenactments of such events as the Minoan eruption and the original splendor of the Parthenon. The film also delves into Classical Greek advancements such as philosophy, theatre, democracy, and the Olympics. The film is narrated by Nia Vardalos.

References

2006 films
2006 documentary films
IMAX short films
Films set in Greece
2006 short films
Films shot in Greece
IMAX documentary films
Short films directed by Greg MacGillivray